Divilacan, officially the Municipality of Divilacan (Ibanag: Ili nat Divilacan; ; Tagalog/Kasiguranin: Bayan ng Divilacan), is a 2nd class municipality in the province of Isabela, Philippines. According to the 2020 census, it has a population of 5,827 people.

Etymology 
Divilacan was derived from the native Casiguran Dumagat Agta compound word vilican, meaning "fish and shell." The word di implies origin.  Therefore, Divilacan literally means “where fish and shells abound.”

History 
Divilacan was a former remote sitio of Barrio Antagan in the neighboring town of Tumauini. It became a separate municipality on June 21, 1969, by virtue of Republic Act No. 5776.

Geography
Divilacan is one of the four coastal municipalities of the province of Isabela facing the Philippine Sea to the east.

The town is bounded to the north by Maconacon, Tumauini to the west, Ilagan City to the southwest, Palanan to the south and the Philippine Sea to the east.

Barangays
Divilacan is politically subdivided into 12 barangays. These barangays are headed by elected officials: Barangay Captain, Barangay Council, whose members are called Barangay Councilors. All are elected every three years.
 Dicambangan
 Dicaruyan
 Dicatian
 Bicobian
 Dilakit
 Dimapnat
 Dimapula (Poblacion) 
 Dimasalansan
 Dipudo
 Dibulos
 Ditarum
 Sapinit

Climate

Demographics

Economy

Government

Local government
The municipality is governed by a mayor designated as its local chief executive and by a municipal council as its legislative body in accordance with the Local Government Code. The mayor, vice mayor, and the councilors are elected directly by the people through an election which is being held every three years.

Elected officials

Congress representation
Divilacan, belonging to the first legislative district of the province of Isabela, currently represented by Hon. Antonio T. Albano.

Education
The Schools Division of Isabela governs the town's public education system. The division office is a field office of the DepEd in Cagayan Valley region. The office governs the public and private elementary and public and private high schools throughout the municipality.

Infrastructure
Divilacan is accessible via sea and air. The town is served by the Maconacon Airport in the neighboring town of Maconacon which connects this isolated town to Cauayan Airport, in Cauayan.

The construction of an 82-kilometer Ilagan-Divilacan Road through the protected Sierra Madre mountains is on-going to open access to the coastal towns of Divilacan, Palanan and Maconacon. The approved budget contract of the project amounting to P1.5B, will pass through the foothills of the 359,486-hectare Northern Sierra Madre mountain ranges. The project will improve an old logging road used by a defunct logging company until the 1990s. It will start in Barangay Sindon Bayabo in Ilagan City and will end in Barangay Dicatian in this town. The project is started in March 2016 and is expected to be completed in 2024.

References

External links

Municipal Profile at the National Competitiveness Council of the Philippines 
Divilacan at the Isabela Government Website
Local Governance Performance Management System
[ Philippine Standard Geographic Code]
Philippine Census Information

Municipalities of Isabela (province)